
Gmina Stara Dąbrowa is a rural gmina (administrative district) in Stargard County, West Pomeranian Voivodeship, in north-western Poland.

Villages
Gmina Stara Dąbrowa contains the villages and settlements of Białuń, Chlebówko, Chlebowo, Kicko, Krzywnica, Łęczówka, Łęczyca, Łęczyna, Moskorze, Nowa Dąbrowa, Parlino, Rokicie, Rosowo, Stara Dąbrowa, Storkówko, Tolcz and Wiry.

Neighbouring gminas
Gmina Stara Dąbrowa is bordered by the gminas of Chociwel, Marianowo, Maszewo and Stargard.

References
Polish official population figures 2006

Stara Dabrowa
Stargard County